San Quentin is a 1946 American romantic drama film directed by Gordon Douglas.

Plot
The warden of San Quentin State Prison takes three of his best-behaved model prisoners to a press event in San Francisco, but Nick Taylor escapes en route.  The warden enlists an old enemy of Taylor's, Jim Roland, to bring him back to justice.  The film comes with a prologue with former Sing Sing warden Lewis E. Lawes advocating the inmates' Mutual Welfare League.

Cast 
 Lawrence Tierney as Jim Roland
 Barton MacLane as Nick Taylor
 Marian Carr as Betty Richards
 Harry Shannon as Warden Kelly
 Carol Forman as Ruthie
 Joe Devlin as 'Broadway' Johnson
 Tom Keene as Hal Schaeffer
 Tony Barrett as Steve Marlowe
 Lee Bonnell as Joe Carzoni
 Robert Clarke as Tommy North
 Raymond Burr as Jeff Torrance
 unbilled players include:  Byron Foulger, Selmer Jackson and Herbert Rawlinson

References

External links 
 
 
 
 

1946 films
Films directed by Gordon Douglas
Films scored by Paul Sawtell
Films set in San Quentin State Prison
1946 crime drama films
American black-and-white films
American crime drama films
American romantic drama films
1946 romantic drama films
1940s English-language films
1940s American films